Daniël A. van der Ree (born 8 January 1972) is a Dutch politician. He was a member of the House of Representatives of the Netherlands for the People's Party for Freedom and Democracy between 7 September 2016 and 23 March 2017. He replaced Anne-Wil Lucas. He previously served in the municipal council of Amsterdam from 11 March 2010 until 5 October 2016. In the municipal council he dealt with land issues and was spokesperson for emphyteusis.

Van der Ree was born in Haarlem. He has had a career in real estate development since 2000. Van der Ree was number 56 on the People's Party for Freedom and Democracy list for the 2012 Dutch general election.

References

External links
  Parlement.com biography

1972 births
Living people
Members of the House of Representatives (Netherlands)
Municipal councillors of Amsterdam
People's Party for Freedom and Democracy politicians
Politicians from Haarlem
21st-century Dutch politicians